Hole-in-the-Wall is a riverside settlement on the east bank of the River Wye in the English county of  Herefordshire.

It is some five miles to the north of the town of Ross-on-Wye and part of the parish of Foy — the village of Foy, a mile to the west, is accessible by a footbridge over the Wye, built in 1919 by David Rowell & Co. It is featured in the British television series Survivors, in an episode titled "Gone Away" (1975).

Court Farm was a PGL activity holidays centre but has now been sold to private owners.

References

External links
 
 : some history and maps.

Hamlets in Herefordshire